Yangy-Aul (Yañawıl) is a rural locality (a village) in Araslanovsky Selsoviet, Meleuzovsky District, Bashkortostan, Russia. The population was 182 as of 2010. There are 2 streets.

Geography 
Yangy-Aul is located 17 km northeast of Meleuz (the district's administrative centre) by road. Islamgulovo is the nearest rural locality.

References 

Rural localities in Meleuzovsky District